Coincya monensis subsp. recurvata, the star mustard or wallflower cabbage, is a subspecies of Coincya monensis.

It is found in eight U.S. states. It may have been introduced to the U.S. as the Isle of Man cabbage and subsequently evolved through the founder effect and geographic isolation into a new subspecies.

References 

Plant subspecies
monensis subsp. recurvata
Taxobox trinomials not recognized by IUCN